Dieter Notz (born 18 September 1955) is a German cross-country skier. He competed in the men's 15 kilometre event at the 1980 Winter Olympics. He also competed in long-distance running, placing tenth in the short race at the 1985 World Mountain Running Trophy, 20th at the 1988 Berlin Marathon, and seventh at the Munich Marathon that same year.

References

1955 births
Living people
People from Bad Urach
Sportspeople from Tübingen (region)
German male cross-country skiers
German male long-distance runners
German male marathon runners
Olympic cross-country skiers of West Germany
Cross-country skiers at the 1980 Winter Olympics
20th-century German people
21st-century German people